The 2014–15 season was Bradford City's 112th season in their history, their 100th in the Football League and 102nd in the league system of English football. It was their second season back in League One after finishing 11th in the previous year.

Pre-Season News

After finishing 11th in the 2013-14 Football League One campaign the Bantams kept the majority of the squad for this season. However captain Gary Jones, winger Garry Thompson, midfielder Nathan Doyle, defenders Matthew Bates and Nathan Curtis were all released along with youth players Jack Stockdill, Louie Swain and Jack Bentley.

Bradford signed midfielder Matthew Dolan on a 1 Year permanent deal after spending the 2013–14 season on loan from Middlesbrough. Also defender Rory McArdle signed a new 3 Year deal with the club. Midfielder Billy Knott signed for Bradford on a 2-year deal after being released from Sunderland, who is described as a 'high-intensity' and 'high-energy' styled player. Bradford made their 3rd Summer signing ahead of the new campaign by signing midfielder Gary Liddle, after he was released by Notts County. Defender Stephen Darby signed a new 3-year deal with the club, who was also appointed as the club's new captain for the 2014–15 season.

It was announced that Blackburn Rovers would visit the Bantams in a pre-season friendly. A day after this news was announced the annual match against Guiseley was revealed to be played on 15 July. Bradford will also travel to Northern Ireland for a pre-season tour as they did in the previous year. There they will face University College Dublin and Shelbourne.

Another pre-season friendly match was confirmed on 29 May, it was announced the club would travel to Morecambe's Globe Arena on 2 August. That will be the first of two matches played within just over a week between the two clubs after they were both drawn together for the first round of the Football League Cup, which will be played in the week commencing 11 August again at the Globe Arena.

Pre-season and friendlies

League One

Matches
The fixtures for the 2014–15 season were announced on 18 June 2014 at 9am.

The first game of the season saw City host Coventry City, the Bantams took the lead through a James Hanson goal however Coventry battled back to equalize through Reda Johnson. Bradford were awarded a penalty which Alan Sheehan converted, Johnson then netted for Coventry in the 89th minute only for Hanson to score a header from a Jason Kennedy cross in the 90th minute to ensure Bradford won their opening game for the first time in 6 years. The next game against Walsall ended with a 0–0 draw however the following game saw the Bantams win 3–1 against Crawley Town, Bradford took a lead early in the second half through a Hanson goal. Crawley equalized shortly after through Joe Walsh. Billy Knott fired the Bantams ahead before Mason Bennett wrapped the game up with a 3rd goal for Bradford. However the unbeaten run was short lived as Peterborough United came away with a 1–0 victory with City unable to score. Bradford's final game in August was a 2–0 win over Rochdale. Rochdale went close early on but former player Jason Kennedy slotted home a scrappy goal to give the Bantams the lead, 6 minutes later Hanson scored his 4th league goal of the season to ensure that City came away with the points.

League table

FA Cup

League Cup

The draw for the first round was made on 17 June 2014 at 10am. Bradford City were drawn at away to Morecambe.

Round 1 saw the Bantams take on Morecambe at the Globe Arena, a hard-fought game was decided in the last 10 minutes as Aaron McLean came off the bench to score the winner for Bradford. The second round draw saw Bradford pulled out alongside arch rivals Leeds United at Valley Parade. The Bantams went 1–0 down late in the game to 10 men Leeds however a 20-yard strike from Billy Knott a minute later leveled the score before James Hanson score the winner another 2 minutes later.

Football League Trophy

Bradford were drawn against Oldham Athletic in the Football League Trophy. Bradford fielded a changed side from recent weeks and were unable to overcome the League One side eventually going out of the cup thanks to a late winner from substitute Jordan Bove.

Squad statistics

Statistics accurate as of 3 May 2015

Transfers

In

Loan In

Loan Out

Out

See also
List of Bradford City A.F.C. seasons

References

Bradford City A.F.C. seasons
Bradford City